Trevor Morris may refer to:

 Trevor Morris (footballer) (1920–2003), Welsh footballer and manager
 Trevor Morris (rugby union) (born 1942), New Zealand rugby union player
 Trevor Morris (musician) (born 1970), Canadian musical composer
 Trevor Morris (bowls) (born 1956), Australian lawn bowls international

See also 
 Trevor Morrice (born 1991), Canadian ski jumper